HMS Blackwater is the name of two of Royal Navy vessels, named after the English River Blackwater:

 , a  launched in 1903 and sunk in 1909

References
 

Royal Navy ship names